12th Street/Jefferson station and  12th Street/Washington station, also collectively known as Eastlake Park, is a pair of light rail stations on Valley Metro Rail in Phoenix, Arizona, United States. It is the fourteenth stop westbound and the fifteenth stop eastbound on the initial  starter line.

Ridership

Notable places nearby
 Eastlake Park
 Phoenix Fire Department Headquarters

References

External links
 Valley Metro map

Valley Metro Rail stations in Phoenix, Arizona
Railway stations in the United States opened in 2008
2008 establishments in Arizona